Vērēmi Parish is an administrative unit of Rēzekne Municipality, Latvia.

Towns, villages and settlements of Verēmi parish 
  - parish administrative center

See also 
 Adamova Manor

References 

Parishes of Latvia
Rēzekne Municipality